The 2017 Men's Junior Pan-American Volleyball Cup was the third edition of the bi-annual men's volleyball tournament. Seven teams participated in this edition held in Fort McMurray.

Competing nations

Competition format
 Seven teams will be divided into two pools. In the group stage each pool will play round robin.
 The first rank teams of each pool after group stage will receive byes into the semifinals.
 The second and third rank teams in each pool will play in the quarterfinals.

Preliminary round
All times are in Canada Standard Time (UTC−06:00)

Group A

Group B

Final round

Championship bracket

Quarterfinals

5th place match

Semifinals

6th place match

3rd place match

Final

Final standing

Individual awards

Most Valuable Player
 
Best Scorer
 
Best Setter
 
Best Opposite
 
Best Outside Hitters
 
 
Best Middle Blockers
 
 
Best Libero
 
Best Server
 
Best Receiver
 
Best Digger

References

External links

Men's Pan-American Volleyball Cup
Pan-American
International volleyball competitions hosted by Canada
2017 in Canadian sports
May 2017 sports events in Canada